Sacred Heart of Jesus School is a co-educational Catholic elementary school established in 1892 as part of Sacred Heart of Jesus Parish in the Archdiocese of New York.  The present school building was dedicated in 1896 and is located at 456 West 52nd Street in New York's Hell's Kitchen.  The faculty of the school consists of laypersons.

Faculty =
Ms. George 6,7,8 grade
Mrs.Ramaraju 6,7,8 grade
Mr.Soto 6,7,8 grade
Mrs. Vamvoukakis 5,4 grade
Mrs.Vera 5,4 grade
Ms.Romero 2nd grade
Ms. Valentino 1st grade
Mrs.Rodriguez kinder
Mrs.Ospenia 3rd grade
Ms. Burks principal
Ms.Miller vice principal
Ms.Sally secretary 
Ms. Angie lunch lady

History

Sisters of Charity

Monsignor Joseph Mooney, pastor of Sacred Heart of Jesus Parish from 1890 to 1923, made it a primary concern to establish a parish school.  In 1892, he purchased four houses on West 51st Street in which to begin a school.  The Sisters of Charity of New York were asked to staff the school which at first was opened to girls.  The first school staff consisted of Sister Marie Austin O’Hara, principal, Sister Mary Agrippina Lyons, Sister Marie Constantin Meehan and Sister Marie Xavier St. Clair.

The school was dedicated in 1896 by The Most Rev. Michael Corrigan, Archbishop of New York and continued to flourish and to grow.

These Sisters of Charity along with Father Mooney faced the difficult period of education when children were not mandated to attend school and child labor laws had not come into being.  The Sisters and the pastor faced a variety of challenges form the opening of a kindergarten in 1898, which was to help serve the needs of working mothers, to class sizes of over 100 students.

The Sisters of Charity under the leadership of Sister Marie Austin not only provided discipline but charity to those in the school who were in need.  Sister Austin kept clothing in a closet in her office for distribution to needy children.  Sister also organized a group of women from the neighborhood to assist families with newborn children or to prepare outfits for special occasions such as First Communion or Confirmation.  Sister Marie Austin also made it an important part of her Sunday ritual to go from house to house to rouse children in time for Mass.  This concern was to influence generations of parents and probably brought some stray souls back to the faith.

The hard work of the Sisters and the pastor shows itself in the fact that Sacred Heart of Jesus School became the largest elementary school on the West Side of Manhattan.  While a figure of 3000 students is sometimes found in the literature describing this period of the school's history, no definite proof of this enrollment can be found.

During the period of time from 1902–1922, Sacred Heart of Jesus School hit record enrollment.  Fourteen Sisters of Charity staffed the school along with 31 lay teachers.  Classes averaged around 100 children.  The students formed a cross section of society from very comfortable to very poor families.  The school staff along with the pastor continued to serve the needs of young by forming service clubs.  The clubs had as many as 200 young people engaged in a variety of works within the parish.  The school added other activities that included dance, violin, chorus and drama.

During these early years of the school's history a vision of educating the whole person emerged and became a hallmark of education at Sacred Heart of Jesus School.  The staff of the school aimed to assist the students in discovering their talents and in developing them.  The students were being developed as spiritual, intellectual, artistic and social persons created in the image and likeness of God; the students were then expected to contribute to the Church and society by putting their skills at the service of their neighbors.

Christian Brothers
In 1924, Father Daniel Quinn, the only native of Sacred Heart of Jesus Parish to serve as pastor, invited the Christian Brothers of Ireland, known today as the Congregation of Christian Brothers, to staff a boys department of Sacred Heart of Jesus School.  The Christian Brothers of Ireland were founded by Blessed Edmund Rice in Waterford, Ireland in 1802. While the Brothers had a strong reputation for discipline they also lived up to the spirit of their motto, Facere et docere, To Do and To Teach.

The first Brothers assigned to serve at Sacred Heart of Jesus School, Brother Ambrose Kelly; principal, Brother Matthias Quinn; Brother Brendan Callan and Brother Austin Loftus were to exert a strong influence on their students; an influence on many students for the rest of their lives.

In 1952, the school had an enrollment of 1200 students, pre-dominantly of Irish-American heritage.  The present convent was constructed in 1952 and the first Mass in the new convent was celebrated by Father Hugh Gilmartin, pastor.

The Sisters of Charity continued their work with the children of the parish but also extended their mission of education to children who were developmentally delayed.  In 1957 under the direction of Sister Marita Imelda Irwin, special education classes opened.

The Christian Brothers moved into their present residence, 416 West 51st Street, in 1953.  Young Christian Brothers were assigned to the community at this time to assist with all of the extra-curricular activities such as athletic teams, dramatic presentations and a variety of parish programs designed to keep the young men of the parish occupied.

Following the Second Vatican Council (1962–1965), Sacred Heart of Jesus School, through the able leadership of its pastors and the Sisters of Charity and the Congregation of Christian Brothers continued to meet the needs of the children entrusted to the school's care. As the number of children in the neighborhood continued to decline, the school population began to decrease as well.  At the same time, the number of religious Brothers and Sisters also decreased.  Faced with increasing costs, the parish could no longer afford to educate boys and girls separately.  The boys department and the girls departments were merged under the able leadership of Sister Nina O’Brien and Brother Matthew DePaul Sinnott.

Recent years
As the school's enrollment continued to decrease it became necessary to consolidate the physical plant and to use the monies from the sale of the Boys’ Department Building to renovate the Girls’ Department Building, our present building, which was larger and able to accommodate all of the students.

In 1987, Sacred Heart of Jesus School became the home to The Cooke Foundation for Special Education.  The school provided space for children who were developmentally delayed to be educated in our building with their own programs and their own teachers.

In the last few years, the school has seen a tremendous number of improvements to its curriculum and its physical plant.  The school's library has been expanded, the computer lab was upgraded and the façade of the building was restored to its original 1896 condition.  These enhancements to the physical plant has also allowed the school to enrich its curriculum.

Over the last 4 years, enrollment continued to grow, making it necessary to renovate older classrooms to accommodate the growing student body.

Today, Sacred Heart of Jesus houses approximately 260 students in grades PK3 to 8th grade. The school also offers FREE full day Pre-K to four-year-old students that reside in the five boroughs.

References

Educational institutions established in 1892
Private middle schools in Manhattan
Roman Catholic elementary schools in Manhattan
1892 establishments in New York (state)